WRHD (94.3 MHz, "94.3 The Game") is a commercial FM radio station in Farmville, North Carolina.  It is owned by Inner Banks Media and airs a sports radio format.  WRHD carries programming from the Fox Sports Radio Network and airs the syndicated "Dan Patrick Show" middays.

History
In 1989, Henry Hinton started New East Communications of Greenville, North Carolina. The company's stations were WGPM 94.3, WCZI and WKQT. WKQT was sold in 1996. In 2003, Archway Broadcasting Group, LLC, bought WGPM and WCZI and announced its acquisition of four Greenville market stations--WRHT, WCBZ, WNBR and WZBR—from Eastern North Carolina Broadcasting Company, Inc for $6.5 Million.

This station was once called WRQR. Later, with the letters WWGL, together with WWEA (formerly WNBR), this was a country music station as "Eagle 94". Then WWEA became WWHA and WWGL became WWNK. The stations were "Hank FM". Inner Banks Media LLC Bought WWHA and WWNK as part of a cluster of stations from Archway for $4.5 million in March 2007. WWHA and WWNK were hot adult contemporary for a short time before switching to new letters and separate formats. WTIB moved to 103.7 FM on March 15, 2010 with WRHD taking the 94.3 frequency.

On August 11, 2014, WRHD flipped to sports talk as 94.3 The Game.

HD radio
WRHD-HD2 aired a variety hits format as "G97.9" early in 2016, and a soft adult contemporary format as "Easy 97.9". On November 20, 2016, the station switched to urban adult contemporary "Fresh 97.9" (relayed on FM translator W250CJ 97.9 FM Winterville). Russ Parr and Keith Sweat will air on the station starting in January 2017.

On February 19, 2019, WRHD-HD2 changed their format from urban adult contemporary to a simulcast of oldies-formatted WNBU 94.1 FM Oriental, branded as "Groovin' Oldies 94.1 & 97.9".

References

External links

Pitt County, North Carolina
RHD
Sports radio stations in the United States
Fox Sports Radio stations